The SPI Extra is a stock index which tracks mid-cap and small-cap companies primarily listed in Switzerland.  The index is calculated by SIX Swiss Exchange. 

It includes all the shares from the Swiss Performance Index (SPI) that are not included in the Swiss Market Index (SMI).  It is therefore often used in investment portfolios such as exchange-traded funds (ETFs), as a small-cap and mid-cap benchmark that complements the SMI.

The SPI Extra was introduced on 29 April 2004, computed back to 3 January 1996 with a baseline value of 1000 points as of 31 December 1999.

Constituents

The index contains all the companies that are in the Swiss Performance Index (SPI), but not among the 20 blue chips that are in the Swiss Market Index (SMI), or equivalently the SPI 20. 

While the SPI Extra overlaps with the SPI Mid+Small, it does not fully coincide because the SMI criteria are not only based on market capitalisation, but also on liquidity.

Tickers

The following are the tickers for the SPI Extra total return, which takes dividends into account. There is also a version of the SPI Extra as a price index. 

 SIX Swiss Exchange: SPIEX
 Swiss Valoren number: 1781097

See also
 Swiss Market Index

References

Swiss stock market indices